The Buginese People, or the Bugis, are an ethnic group of Austronesian ancestry that inhabit parts of Southeast Asia

Bugis may also refer to:

Buginese language, the language of the Buginese people
Bugis, Singapore, a subzone of the Downtown Core district of Singapore
Kampong Bugis, a subzone located in the town of Kallang, Singapore
Bugis Street (film), a 1995 film
Kue bugis, an Indonesian desert made of soft glutinous rice

See also
Bugi (disambiguation)